Osman Şahin (born 13 January 1998) is a Turkish professional footballer who plays as a midfielder for Iğdır.

Professional career
Şahin made his professional debut with Erzurumspor in a 1-0 Süper Lig loss to Başakşehir on 2 September 2018.

References

External links
 
 
 

1998 births
People from Arsin, Turkey
Living people
Turkish footballers
Association football midfielders
Büyükşehir Belediye Erzurumspor footballers
24 Erzincanspor footballers
Ofspor footballers
Hatayspor footballers
İskenderun FK footballers
Süper Lig players
TFF First League players
TFF Second League players
TFF Third League players